The Bharatiya Janata Party, or simply,  BJP Karnataka (BJP;), 
is the state unit of the Bharatiya Janata Party of the Karnataka. Its head office is situated at the BJP Bhavan, 11th Cross, Temple Street, Malleshwaram, Bengaluru. The current president of BJP Karnataka is Nalin Kumar Kateel. It is the current ruling party of Karnataka. 

Till date 4 chief ministers from the party have served the state

Electoral history
BJP contested 110 seats in the January 1983 Karnataka Legislative Assembly election, winning 18 seats and obtained 7.9% of the votes cast across the state. Out of its 110 candidates, 71 lost their deposits. Along with the Andhra Pradesh legislative election there same year, this marked the first major performance of the party in southern India. Nine out of the 18 BJP legislators came from the coastal districts. The influence of BJP in Karnataka was marked by its inability to mobilize support in rural areas, where the Janata Dal leader Ramakrishna Hegde and Abdul Nazir Sab (Hegde's Rural Development Minister) had built a strong network of local Janata Dal leaders through the panchayat system. After the 1983 election the BJP offered some outside support to the Hedge government.

The party suffered a set-back in the 1985 Karnataka Legislative Assembly election, only 2 of its 115 candidates were elected. The party obtained 3.7% of the state-wide vote and 100 of its candidates lost their deposits.

The 1980s was characterized by internal strife in the BJP Karnataka unit, as the followers of Ananth Kumar and V. Dhananjay Kumar combatted each other. Ananth Kumar was the secretary of the Karnataka BJP unit 1987–1988. In 1988, trying to overcome the split, B. S. Yediyurappa was chosen as the consensus candidate for the presidency of the BJP Karnataka state unit. 
BJP contested 119 seats in the 1989 Karnataka Legislative Assembly election, winning four seats and obtaining 4.13% of the votes cast across the state.

BJP obtained 28.8% of the votes in Karnataka in the 1991 Indian general election. This result marked a sharp increase from the 2.5% of the votes that the party had received in the 1989 Indian general election in Karnataka. This time BJP had contested all 28 Lok Sabha seats in the state, winning four. The growth of BJP vote in Karnataka was partially due to the Ram Janmabhoomi campaign and the nationalist discourse of the party.

BJP fielded 223 candidates in the 1994 Karnataka Legislative Assembly election. Ahead of the election the party state unit published a 41-page manifesto, seeking to portray a pragmatic and populist approach of the party with a focus on socio-economic issues rather than communalist discourse. After the 1994 Karnataka Legislative Assembly election, BJP held the role as Leader of Opposition in the assembly for a brief period. The electoral result had an important symbolic meaning for the BJP, who had begun to see Karnataka as its 'gateway' into south India.

By the late 1990s, Karnataka was the sole state in southern India where BJP wasn't a marginal political phenomenon. During this period, the anti-reservation stance of BJP in response to the Mandal Commission had attracted support among higher castes in Karnataka, rather than Hindutva nationalism per se. The 1999 split in the Janata Dal offered the BJP the possibility to do inroads among Lingayat voters. However, as of the late 1990s the BJP Karnataka state organization remained weak, with the strength of the party concentrated in urban pockets and a few rural pockets (Coorg and the two coastal districts). In the 1998 Lok Sabha parliamentary election, BJP increased its number of seats in Karnataka from six to 13. BJP had contested the election in coalition with Lok Shakti, through which BJP had contested 18 seats and Lok Shakti 10 seats. With Lok Shakti's Hegde campaigning for the BJP, the party was somewhat able to portray a more moderate image and tone down its Hindutva profile.

Just before the 1999 Karnataka Legislative Assembly election, the BJP national leadership forced its Karnataka branch into an alliance with the then governing Janata Dal (United). Thus the party could not benefit from the anti-incumbency wave against the Janata Dal cabinet. The tie-up with the Janata Dal (United) was unpopular among BJP workers in the state. Following the 1999 Karnataka Legislative Assembly election the party obtained the Leader of Opposition role again.

The more significant breakthrough of BJP as a major actor in Karnataka state politics came in 2004. In the 2004 Karnataka Legislative Assembly election, the party won 71 out of 224 seats. Whilst BJP remained organizationally weak in rural Karnataka, it managed to increase its share of vote by attracting Lingayat voters from parts of northern Karnataka. In the 2004 Lok Sabha parliamentary election, BJP won 18 seats from Karnataka. BJP had become the largest party in the state assembly, but could not form a government as the Janata Dal (Secular) and the Congress Party formed a coalition. The JD(S)-Congress coalition, however, suffered internal strife and in 2006 H.D Kumarswami struck a deal with BJP which stipulated that the post of Chief Minister would be given to BJP after a 20-month period. In 2007, when the 20 months had passed, H.D Kumarswami opted to retain the position, sparking outcry and a wave of sympathy towards BJP and B. S. Yediyurappa.

The strength of BJP in Karnataka state politics increased significantly between October 2007 and April 2009. Ahead of the 2008 Karnataka Legislative Assembly election, BJP had emerged as the sole viable alternative to the Janata Dal (S) and the Congress Party in Karnataka state politics. Following the formation of the BJP state government in 2008, there was a wave of attacks on Christian churches in Karnataka. The National Commission for Minorities denounced the BJP state governments for inaction in preventing the attacks. Under pressure from the central government, the BJP state government arrested a number of Shri Ram Sena leaders.

In the 2013 Karnataka Legislative Assembly election, the BJP fell to third place in the state behind the Indian National Congress and Janata Dal (Secular). While the INC won a majority in the Legislative Assembly with 122 seats, the BJP fell to 40 seats.

The decision of the Congress state government to grant minority status to the Lingayats prompted the RSS (a move seen by RSS as "an attempt to divide the Hindus") to take a more active role in supporting the BJP in the 2018 state elections. RSS brought in senior leaders from across the country for the state election campaign. Reportedly some 50,000 RSS cadres campaigned for BJP, as well as some 3,000 Vishwa Hindu Parishad and Bajrang Dal cadres. RSS mobilization for BJP in the electoral campaign was particularly strong in the coastal districts (a stronghold of RSS, but also an area with sizable Christian and Muslim populations).

Support base
For many years, the BJP support base was mainly Brahmin, but in later years expanded to include more Lingayats (as well as some Vokkaligas). Most of the party state leadership is either Lingayat or Brahmin. By the 2000s, the party had sought support among other communities, such as the OBCs, Dalits and Vokkaligas, utilizing communal issues as mobilizing factor (albeit with limited success).

Electoral history

Legislative Assembly elections

Lok Sabha elections

Leadership

S. Mallikarjunaiah was the Vice President of the BJP Karnataka state unit between 1980 and 1986. He again held the post as BJP Karnataka state unit Vice President 1990–1991.

Nalin Kumar Kateel was appointed as the president of the Karnataka state unit of BJP on August 20, 2019. Reportedly the outgoing president B. S. Yediyurappa had favoured Arvind Limbavali for the post, but the National General Secretary (Organisation) of the party B.L. Santosh had favoured Kateel due to his credentials as a RSS loyalist. Soon after taking over as state unit president Kateel named Bhanuprakash and Nirmal Kumar Surana as Vice Presidents of the BJP state unit. The two leaders, seen as part of the 'old guard' of the party, had been ousted from the state leadership in 2016.

List of Chief Ministers

List of Deputy Chief Ministers

Opposition leaders in Legislative Assembly

Opposition leaders in Legislative Council

List of Presidents

See also
 Bharatiya Janata Party, Gujarat
 Bharatiya Janata Party, Uttar Pradesh
 Bharatiya Janata Party, Madhya Pradesh
 State units of the Bharatiya Janata Party

References

Works cited
 

Karnataka
Political parties in Karnataka